Pendragon Records was a short-lived American industrial and electronic music record label that was founded in 1997 by Irish expatriate Colm O'Connor.  The label was based out of Philadelphia, Pennsylvania.  Pendragon released a total of 25 albums from artists based in the United States, Canada, and Germany.  Notable bands signed to Pendragon included Haujobb, Gridlock, Velvet Acid Christ, and Xorcist.

Its first release, PEN100, was Haujobb's Homes and Gardens.  The label was bought out by Metropolis Records in 1999 shortly after it released Halo_Gen's self-titled album as PEN125. When Metropolis Records bought Pendragon, they continued to sell Pendragon's backstock. Some of the bands that had been signed to Pendragon, such as Haujobb and Imperative Reaction, continued to release music on Metropolis Records. Others, such as Gridlock, moved to other labels after the acquisition.

Bands on Pendragon Records
 Fektion Fekler
 Fracture
 Gridlock
 Halo_Gen
 Haujobb
 Imperative Reaction
 Individual Totem
 Kalte Farben
 La Floa Maldita
 Neutronic
 THD
 Velvet Acid Christ
 Wave Workers Foundation
 Xorcist

See also
 Metropolis Records
 List of record labels

External links
 Discogs label summary and complete discography

Record labels established in 1997
Record labels disestablished in 1999
American independent record labels
Electronic music record labels
Industrial record labels